Lleucu Roberts (born 27 September 1964) is a Welsh author.

Biography
Born in Aberystwyth, she grew up in Ceredigion's Bow Street, taking courses at Rhydypennau Primary School, Penweddig Comprehensive School, and Aberystwyth University.

In 2011 she won a Tir na n-Og Award for her novel Stuff Guto S Thomas. She went on to win the Daniel Owen Memorial Prize and the Prose Medal at the Carmarthenshire National Eisteddfod 2014, becoming the first person to win the two main prose prizes in the same year. Roberts also writes radio and television scripts.

Her works include Songs of Peace (1991), Turning a Deaf Ear (2005), Dear Little Spot (2008), The Girl on the Road (2009), Stuff- Guto S. Tomos (2010), Well, Little Wales! (2011) and Some Kind of Insult (2012). She currently lives in Rhostryfan, Gwynedd, with her husband and two daughters and sons.

References

Living people
1964 births
People from Aberystwyth
Alumni of Aberystwyth University
Welsh children's writers
Welsh women novelists
Welsh radio writers
Welsh television writers
People from Gwynedd
British women children's writers
Women radio writers
British women television writers
British women screenwriters
20th-century Welsh novelists
20th-century Welsh women writers
21st-century Welsh novelists
21st-century Welsh women writers
21st-century Welsh writers